Arianida is a genus of longhorn beetles of the subfamily Lamiinae, containing the following species:

 Arianida albosternalis Breuning, 1942
 Arianida mactata Fairmaire, 1903

References

Tragocephalini